Austin is a census-designated place and unincorporated community in Tunica County, Mississippi, United States. Per the 2020 Census, the population was 51.

Once a thriving shipping port on the Mississippi River, Austin served as county seat from 1847 to 1888. Earlier county seats were Commerce and Peyton.

History
Austin was founded in 1847 and named for Austin Miller, who donated the land on which the town and a courthouse were built.

Austin was burned in 1863 by Union soldiers of the Mississippi Marine Brigade under the command of Alfred W. Ellet.  Two houses were spared.

The town rebuilt and was incorporated in 1871, though it is no longer incorporated.

In 1884, the area was flooded when a nearby levee broke. When waters receded, a large sandbar had been left between the town and the Mississippi River, and steamboats could no longer land.

In 1888, the county seat was moved to Tunica, a more accessible location.

Demographics

2020 census

Note: the US Census treats Hispanic/Latino as an ethnic category. This table excludes Latinos from the racial categories and assigns them to a separate category. Hispanics/Latinos can be of any race.

Notable person
 Sport McAllister (1874–1962), professional baseball player.

References

Unincorporated communities in Tunica County, Mississippi
Unincorporated communities in Mississippi
Census-designated places in Tunica County, Mississippi
Memphis metropolitan area
Mississippi populated places on the Mississippi River